The 2002–03 NBA season was the 33rd season of the National Basketball Association in Cleveland, Ohio. In the 2002 NBA draft, the Cavaliers selected Dajuan Wagner from the University of Memphis with the sixth pick, and selected Carlos Boozer out of Duke University with the 34th pick in the second round. During the off-season, the team acquired Darius Miles from the Los Angeles Clippers. After a 2–2 start to the season, the Cavaliers suffered a dreadful 15-game losing streak between November and December. They would continue to struggle as head coach John Lucas was replaced with Keith Smart after an 8–34 start. At midseason, Tyrone Hill was released to free agency and re-signed as a free agent with his former team, the Philadelphia 76ers, while Bimbo Coles was also released and signed with the Boston Celtics. The Cavaliers finished the season with a 17–65 record, last place in the Eastern Conference and tied for the worst record in the NBA along with the Denver Nuggets. It was also the team's worst record since the 1981–82 season.

Despite their awful season, Ricky Davis showed improvement averaging 20.6 points, 5.5 assists and 1.6 steals per game. Center Zydrunas Ilgauskas averaged 17.2 points, 7.5 rebounds and 1.9 blocks per game, and was selected for the 2003 NBA All-Star Game, while Boozer made the NBA All-Rookie Second Team, averaging 10.0 points and 7.5 rebounds per game. Wagner averaged 13.4 points per game, but only played just 47 games due to a knee injury. Following the season, Jumaine Jones was traded to the Boston Celtics.

Offseason

Free agents

Trades

Draft picks

Roster

Note
Bold = All-Star selection

Regular season

Season standings

Record vs. opponents

Game log

October

Record: 1–1; Home: 0–0; Road: 1–1

November

Record: 1–15; Home: 1–6; Road: 0–9

December

Record: 4–11; Home: 4–6; Road: 0–5

January

Record: 3–11; Home: 1–3; Road: 2–8

February

Record: 2–9; Home: 2–5; Road: 0–4

March

Record: 3–12; Home: 3–5; Road: 0–7

April

Record: 3–6; Home: 3–2; Road: 0–4

 Green background indicates win.
 Red background indicates loss.

Player stats

Regular season

Awards and records

Awards

Records

Milestones

All-Star

Transactions

Trades

Free agents

Development League

References

External links
 Cleveland Cavaliers on Database Basketball
 Cleveland Cavaliers on Basketball Reference

Cleveland Cavaliers seasons
Cleve
Cleve